SIT Optibús (officially Sistema Integrado de Transporte Optibús) is a bus rapid transit (BRT) system  operating in León, Guanajuato, Mexico. Locally it is known also as "La Oruga" (the caterpillar), due to its use of articulated buses. Most of the Optibús route uses city streets, but with dedicated bus lanes and high-level platform stations. The system was inaugurated on September 27, 2003. León was the first city in Mexico to implement a BRT system.  In some respects it is similar to other Latin American BRT systems such as the Mexico City Metrobús, the Guadalajara Macrobús, the Bogotá Transmilenio, the Guatemala City Transmetro, and the Monterrey Transmetro.

León is  one of the few cities in Mexico that has a modern, municipally operated bus transit system and utilizes prepaid farecards (known as Pagobús), as opposed to the traditional Mexican pesero system of individual bus owner-operators collecting cash fares. The prepaid farecard system was put in place about four years before the Optibús system.

External links
 Official Optibús Web Site (Spanish)

Bus companies of Mexico
Bus rapid transit in Mexico
2003 establishments in Mexico
León, Guanajuato
Transport companies established in 2003